Augusto Mendes (born March 3, 1983) is a Brazilian professional mixed martial artist and Brazilian jiu jitsu practitioner. He is currently signed to the Absolute Championship Berkut. He was the International Brazilian Jiu-Jitsu Federation Black Belt World (IBJJF World) 70 kg champion (2013), International Brazilian Jiu-Jitsu Federation World Nogi (IBJJF World No-Gi) 73.5 kg champion in 2012 and 2015 and UAEJJF Abu Dhabi World Pro Champion in 2011 and 2013.

Background
Mendes was born in Rio de Janeiro, Brazil. He started training Brazilian jiu jitsu (BJJ) in 1997 in Kioto gym in Tijuca when he was introduced by his brother, Bruno Tank who was a BJJ protectionist. He trained under Alvaro and Krauss Monsor who was the student of 9th degree black belt master Francisco Mansor. At fourteen, training three times a day, he competed four months later, winning a bronze medal in the Rio State Championships and in the same year he took home the silver medal in the Brazilian Championship. He started teaching BJJ two years later and continue to win many regional, international and world medals, notably IBJJF World 70 kg champion in 2013, IBJJF World No-Gi 73.5 kg champion in 2012 and 2015 and UAEJJF Abu Dhabi World Pro Champion (in 2011 and 2013.

Medes and his brother Bruno Mendes open their BJJ gym, Renovacao BJJ, in 2005 and started transitioned to MMA training. Two years later, together with Rafael Barbosa, Leandro Escobar and his brother Bruno Mendes they founded Soul Fighters gym in 2008.

Mixed martial arts career

Early career
Mendes started his professional mixed martial arts career in April 2014 after just one win in an amateur fight. He went to secure a 5 fight winning streak and was signed by UFC one year later in 2015.

Ultimate Fighting Championship

Mendes made his debut with 5 day short notice, replacing injured John Lineker, at UFC on February 21, 2016, at UFC Fight Night: Cowboy vs. Cowboy against Cody Garbrandt.  he was knocked out and lost the fight in round one.

Mendes's second fight in UFC was set one year later on January 15, 2017, after an ACL surgery, at UFC Fight Night: Rodríguez vs. Penn against Frankie Saenz.   He won the fight via split decision with the scoreboard of (28-29, 29–28, 29–28). This win earned him Fight of the Night award.

On April 15, 2017, Mendes face Aljamain Sterling at UFC on Fox: Johnson vs Reis.  After three rounds fight, he lost the fight via unanimous decision.

Mendes was expected to face Boston Salmon on October 28, 2017, at UFC Fight Night: Brunson vs. Machida. However, Mendes pulled out of the fight on October 3, citing leg injury. He was replaced a week later by promotional newcomer Raoni Barcelos.

Mendes was expected to face Merab Dvalishvili on April 21, 2018, at UFC Fight Night 128. However, he was pulled from the fight after he was notified of a potential USADA violation.

On June 8, 2018, it was reported that Mendes who had one fight with UFC, was granted release after USADA suspension, and joined Absolute Championship Berkut (ACB).

Post-UFC career
In his promotional debut Mendes faced Ivan Zhirkov at ACA 96: Goncharov vs. Johnson on June 8, 2019. He lost the fight via split decision.

Jiu Jitsu career

Mendes competed in Absolute Championship Berkut 6: Jiu Jitsu no-gi (145 Ibs) grand prix tournament on July 16, 2017, in Moscow.Competitors in the division included Paulo Miyao, Leo Vieira, Isaque Paiva, Osvaldo Moizinho, Kim Terra, Gabriel Marangoni and Rafael Mansur. He defeated Rafael Mansur on quarterfinal and lost to Paulo Miyao in the semi final.

Mendes competed in Absolute Championship Berkut 9: Jiu Jitsu no-gi 60 kg Grand Prix tournament on December 9, 2017, in Moscow. He won the tournament after submitted Milton Bastos via a kimura under twenty seconds in the quarterfinal round and he proceeded to semifinal round where he won the fight against Joao Miyao, a world champion. He took on Samir Chantre at the final and won via a guillotine in the fifth round.

Personal life 
Mendes's moniker "Tanquinho" means "Little Tank" in Portuguese which was coined after his older brother, Bruno Mendes' moniker "Tank".

Prior relocating to United States, Mendes taught BJJ at Tijuca Tenis Club as the head instructor.

Mendes is a certified referee by Confederação Brasileira de Jiu-Jitsu (CBJJ).

Mendes earned a degree in physical education at the University Estacio de Sá

Mendes has opened and operates a Brazilian Jiu-Jitsu Gym in Tempe, Arizona called the AT Academy.

Championships and achievements

Mixed Martial Arts
Ultimate Fighting Championship
Fight of the Night (One time) vs. Frankie Saenz

Jiu Jitsu

 IBJJF World Champion (2013)
 IBJJF World No-Gi Champion (2012 and 2015)
 UAEJJF Abu Dhabi World Pro Champion (2011 and 2013)
 CBJJ/IBJJF South American Champion (2010)
 UAEJJF Abu Dhabi World Pro Champion (2011 and 2013)
 CBJJ/IBJJF South American Champion (2010)
 USBJJF/IBJJF American National Champion (2012)
 CBJJ Brazilian National Teams Champion (2008, 2009 and 2010)
 Copa Podio “Couples Challenge” Superfight Winner (2013)
 World Expo Superfight Winner (2014)
 FJJR Rio State Champion (2008–2010)
 IBJJF Rio International Open Champion (2009 and 2010)
 IBJJF Las Vegas International Open Champion (2012)
 IBJJF European Open Runner-up (2013)
 IBJJF New York International Open Runner-up (2010)
 IBJJF Pan American Championship 3rd Place (2009, 2011 and 2013)
 CBJJ Brazilian National Championship 3rd Place (2005, 2008, 2010 and 2011)
No-Gi Absolute Championship Berkut Jiu Jitsu
 2017 No Gi Absolute Championship Berkut Jiu Jitsu 60 kg champion

ADCC
Male 66 kg ADCC 2019 Champion (2019)

Mixed martial arts record

|-
|Loss
|align=center|6–3
|Igor Zhirkov
|Decision (split)
|ACA 96: Goncharov vs. Johnson
|
|align=center|3
|align=center|5:00
|Lodz, Poland
|  
|-
|Loss
|align=center| 6–2
|Aljamain Sterling
|Decision (unanimous)
|UFC on Fox: Johnson vs. Reis
|
|align=center|3
|align=center| 5:00
|Kansas City, Missouri United States
|
|-
|Win
|align=center| 6–1
|Frankie Saenz
|Decision (split)
|UFC Fight Night: Rodríguez vs. Penn
|
|align=center|3
|align=center|5:00
|Phoenix, Arizona, United States
|
|-
|Loss
|align=center| 5–1
|Cody Garbrandt
|KO (punches) 
|UFC Fight Night: Cowboy vs. Cowboy
|
|align=center|1
|align=center|4:18
|Pittsburgh, Pennsylvania, United States
|
|-
|Win
|align=center| 5–0
|Donald Williams
|Submission (triangle choke)
|LFC 43
|
|align=center|1
|align=center|0:53
|Burbank, California, United States
|
|-
|Win
|align=center|4–0
|Evan Martinez
|TKO (elbows)
|LFC 38
|
|align=center|1
|align=center|1:35
|Ontario, California, United States
|
|-
|Win
|align=center|3–0
|Richard Delfin
|Decision (unanimous)
|King of the Cage: Sinister Intentions
|
|align=center|3
|align=center|5:00
|Las Vegas, Nevada, United States
|
|-
|Win
|align=center|2–0
|Omar Castro
|Submission (armbar)
|DFD 9
|
|align=center|2
|align=center|3:19
|Rancho Mirage, California, United States
|
|-
|Win
|align=center|1–0
|Xavier Ramirez
|Submission (armbar)
|King of the Cage: Fisticuffs
|
|align=center|1
|align=center|3:23
|Highland, California, United States
|

Grappling record

See also
List of current UFC fighters
List of male mixed martial artists
World Jiu-Jitsu Championship
World Nogi Brazilian Jiu-Jitsu Championship

References

External links
 
 

Living people
1983 births
Brazilian male mixed martial artists
Bantamweight mixed martial artists
Mixed martial artists utilizing Muay Thai
Mixed martial artists utilizing wrestling
Mixed martial artists utilizing Brazilian jiu-jitsu
Sportspeople from Rio de Janeiro (city)
Doping cases in mixed martial arts
Brazilian practitioners of Brazilian jiu-jitsu
People awarded a black belt in Brazilian jiu-jitsu
Brazilian Muay Thai practitioners
Ultimate Fighting Championship male fighters
World No-Gi Brazilian Jiu-Jitsu Championship medalists